Typocaeta is a genus of beetles in the family Cerambycidae, containing the following species:

 Typocaeta kenyana Teocchi, 1991
 Typocaeta parva (Breuning, 1940)
 Typocaeta subfasciata Thomson, 1864
 Typocaeta togoensis Adlbauer, 1995

References

Agapanthiini